Kharyyalakh (Xarıyalaax) is a rural locality (a selo), the only inhabited locality, and the administrative center of Kirbeysky Rural Okrug of Olenyoksky District in the Sakha Republic, Russia, located  from Olenyok, the administrative center of the district. Its population as of the 2010 Census was 846, up from 832 recorded during the 2002 Census.

Geography 

References

Notes

Sources
Official website of the Sakha Republic. Registry of the Administrative-Territorial Divisions of the Sakha Republic. Olenyoksky District. 

Rural localities in the Sakha Republic
Olenyok basin